Sowme'eh Sara (also Romanized as Şowme‘eh Sarā, Somee Sara, Şowma‘eh Sarā, Şūme‘eh Sarā, Sumehsara, and Sumesera) is a city and capital of Sowme'eh Sara County, Gilan Province, Iran.  At the 2006 census, its population was 36,522, in 10,070 families.

Rice has been cultivated in this region for many years, where some indigenous cultivars (landrace) were conventionally bred by farmers.

Demographics 
People of Sowme'eh Sara are mostly Gilaks and they speak the Sowme'eh Sarai variety of Western Gilaki language.

Linguistic composition of the city.

References

Populated places in Sowme'eh Sara County

Cities in Gilan Province
Populated places on the Caspian Sea

Azerbaijani settlements in Gilan Province
 
Gilak settlements in Gilan Province